Ben Wellington (born 9 January 1982) is an Australian former rugby league player who played during the 2000s. He played his entire club football career for the Sydney Roosters. His position of choice was

Playing career
In 2002, Wellington took part in the 2002 Jersey Flegg Grand Final in the Sydney Roosters victory over the St George Illawarra Dragons. He made his first grade debut in his side's 36–28 win over the Cronulla Sharks at the Sydney Football Stadium in round 22 of the 2003 season, Wellington also scored his lone try in first grade his debut match. His final game of first grade came in his side's 46–16 win over the Manly Sea Eagles at the Sydney Football Stadium in round 24 of the 2003 season. Later that season, Wellington was left out of the side in the Roosters' 18-6 Grand Final loss to the Penrith Panthers. He was released by the Roosters at the end of the 2003 season and subsequently never played first grade rugby league again.

References

1982 births
Sydney Roosters players
Australian rugby league players
Rugby league centres
Living people